Shaw's Hotel is a family-operated inn located at Brackley Beach on the north shore of Prince Edward Island, Canada. Established in 1860 when the Shaw family first allowed paying guests to stay at their farmhouse, the hotel was designated a National Historic Site of Canada in 2003. Shaw's Hotel is situated 600 meters from the Brackley beach which boasts the longest dune system in the western hemisphere.

The author Pierre Berton wrote part of The National Dream while staying at the hotel. The main lodging contains 17 rooms. There are also 25 cottages around the property.

References

External links
Shaw's Hotel Website

National Historic Sites in Prince Edward Island
Hotels on the National Historic Sites of Canada register